Charles Ruffing Parker (born June 19, 1941) is an American-born Canadian football player who played professionally for the Montreal Alouettes.

References

1941 births
Living people
Montreal Alouettes players
People from Greenville, Alabama
Southern Miss Golden Eagles football players